Linea alba can refer to:
 Linea alba (abdomen)
 Linea alba (cheek)